Örnsköldsvik Airport , is a regional airport located  northeast of Örnsköldsvik, Sweden, at Husum, built in 1961.

History 
The airport had 80,123 passengers in 2013 and a record of 165,712 in 2000. On 31 October 2014, Örnsköldsvik airport received permission to have the first remote controlled air control tower in the world. The tower is controlled from Sundsvall-Timrå Airport.

Airlines and destinations

Statistics

References

External links
 Örnsköldsvik Airport

Airports in Sweden
Transport in Örnsköldsvik
International airports in Sweden